Eduardo Arturo Dockendorff Vallejos (born 22 January 1949) is a Chilean architect and politician who served as minister during Ricardo Lagos' government (2000–2006).

References

1949 births
Living people
Chilean people
Chilean architects
Chilean people of German descent
University of Chile alumni
Karlsruhe Institute of Technology alumni
21st-century Chilean politicians
Christian Democratic Party (Chile) politicians